Malcha may refer to:

 Malha, a neighbourhood in southwest Jerusalem
 Malha Mall, a shopping mall in Malha, Jerusalem
 The Jerusalem Technology Park, also known as Malha Technology Park
 Jerusalem–Malha railway station
 Malicheh, Tuyserkan, a village in Tuyserkan, Iran
 (Hebrew: Nahal Malcha, Arabic:  Wadi al-Malih), a stream in West Bank
 Korean name for matcha, green tea powder